Kasama may refer to:

Kasama, Ibaraki, Japan
Kasama, Zambia
Kasama District, Zambia

See also
Kazama